Ronald J. DiPerna (11 February 1947, in Somerville, Massachusetts – 8 January 1989, in Princeton, New Jersey) was an American mathematician, who worked on nonlinear partial differential equations.

Ronald Diperna did his undergraduate studies at Tufts University before being advised to attend
graduate school by Professor George Leger.  In 1972 DiPerna received from the Courant Institute of Mathematical Sciences his Ph.D. under James Glimm with thesis Global solutions to a class of nonlinear hyperbolic systems. He held academic positions at Brown University, the University of Michigan, the University of Wisconsin, and Duke University, before he became in 1985 a professor at the University of California, Berkeley. He died unexpectedly at age 41 shortly after the end of a sabbatical year as a visiting scholar at the Institute for Advanced Study.

 
In the last part of his career he worked with Pierre-Louis Lions on integro-differential equations in the kinetic theory of gases (Cauchy problem for Boltzmann equations) and the plasma physics generalization (Vlasov equation). He also worked on singularities in compressible flow. DiPerna with Andrew Majda began in 1986 research on the question of the existence of solutions to the Euler equations in two dimensions with initial conditions that are found in the evolution of vortex sheets. DiPerna and Majda introduced the Concentration-Cancellation Method.

DiPerna was a Guggenheim Fellow for the academic year 1984–1985 and a Sloan Fellow for the academic year 1978–1979. In 1986 he was an invited speaker at the International Congress of Mathematicians in Berkeley 1986 and gave a talk Compactness of solutions to nonlinear PDEs.

He was married to Maria E. Schonbek, a professor of mathematics at the University of California, Santa Cruz and had a daughter. In his honor, the University of California at Berkeley established the DiPerna Lectures in Applied Mathematics.

Selected publications

Uniqueness of solutions to hyperbolic conservation laws, Indiana Univ. Math. J. 28 (1979), 137–188.
 
Convergence of the viscosity method for isentropic gas dynamics, Comm. Math. Phys. 91 (1983), 1–30, Online

Compensated Compactness and general systems of Conservation Laws, Transactions AMS, 292, 1985, 383-420
with Pierre-Louis Lions: 
with Pierre-Louis Lions: 
with Lions:

References

1947 births
1989 deaths
20th-century American mathematicians
Courant Institute of Mathematical Sciences alumni
University of California, Berkeley faculty
Fluid dynamicists
PDE theorists
Institute for Advanced Study visiting scholars
People from Somerville, Massachusetts
Mathematicians from Massachusetts